Onora Sylvia O'Neill, Baroness O'Neill of Bengarve  (born 23 August 1941) is a British philosopher and a crossbench member of the House of Lords.

Early life and education 
Onora Sylvia O'Neill was born on 23 August 1941 in Aughafatten. The daughter of Sir Con O'Neill, she was educated partly in Germany and at St Paul's Girls' School, London, before studying philosophy, psychology and physiology at Somerville College, Oxford. She went on to complete a doctorate at Harvard University, with John Rawls as supervisor.

Career 
During the 1970s, she taught at Barnard College, the women's college in Columbia University, New York City. In 1977, she returned to Britain and took up a post at the University of Essex; she was Professor of Philosophy there when she became Principal of Newnham College, Cambridge in 1992.

She is an Emeritus Professor of Philosophy at the University of Cambridge, a former President of the British Academy (2005–2009) and chaired the Nuffield Foundation (1998–2010). From 2004 to 2006, she was President of the British Philosophical Association. In 2013, she held the Spinoza Chair of Philosophy at the University of Amsterdam. Until October 2006, she was the Principal of Newnham College, Cambridge, and she was chair of the Equality and Human Rights Commission until April 2016. O'Neill's work has earned her numerous honours and awards, including the million-dollar Berggruen Prize.

Philosophy
O'Neill has written widely on political philosophy and ethics, international justice, bioethics and the philosophy of Immanuel Kant.

Across various works, O'Neill has defended and applied a constructivist interpretation of Kantian ethics heavily influenced by, and yet critical of, the work of John Rawls, emphasising the importance of trust, consent and respect for autonomy in a just society. She has written extensively about trust, noting "that people often choose to rely on the very people whom they claimed not to trust" and suggesting that we "need to free professionals and the public service to serve the public...to work towards more intelligent forms of accountability...[and] to rethink a media culture in which spreading suspicion has become a routine activity".

Honours and distinctions
O'Neill has been President of the Aristotelian Society (1988 to 1989), a member of the Animal Procedures Committee (1990 to 1994), chair of Nuffield Council on Bioethics (1996 to 1998), a member and then acting chair of the Human Genetics Advisory Commission (1996 to 1999) and a member of the select committee on BBC Charter Review.  She is presently chair of the Nuffield Foundation (since 1997), a trustee of Sense about Science (since 2002), a trustee of the Ditchley Foundation, and a trustee of the Gates Cambridge Trust. She also served as President of the British Academy between 2005 and 2009. She is on the Advisory Board of Incentives for Global Health, the NGO formed to develop the Health Impact Fund proposal.

In 1999, she was created a life peer as Baroness O'Neill of Bengarve, of The Braid in the County of Antrim, and in 2007 was elected an Honorary FRS. She is also a Foreign Honorary Member of the American Academy of Arts and Sciences (1993) and the Austrian Academy of Sciences (2002), a Foreign Member of the American Philosophical Society (2003), and Hon. Member Royal Irish Academy (2003), a Foreign Member of the Leopoldina (2004) and the Norwegian Academy of Sciences (2006) and a Fellow of the Academy of Medical Sciences. She is an elected fellow of the Hastings Center, an independent bioethics research institution. In 2007, O'Neill became a Honorary Fellow of the Royal Society. In 2004 she was awarded an Honorary Degree (Doctor of Letters) from the University of Bath. She is a Distinguished Senior Fellow of the School of Advanced Study, University of London, an honour awarded in 2009.

O'Neill also received an Honorary Doctorate from Heriot-Watt University in 2007, and from Harvard in 2010.

In October 2012, she was nominated as the next Chair of the Equality and Human Rights Commission, and confirmed as such in January 2013.

O'Neill was appointed a Member of the Order of the Companions of Honour (CH) in the 2014 New Year Honours for services to philosophy and public policy.

In 2014, O'Neill was elected to the German order Pour le mérite für Wissenschaften und Künste.

In September 2015, during the XII. quinquennial international Kant-conference in Vienna, she received the Kant-Preis of the Fritz Thyssen Stiftung for her scholarly work on the practical and political philosophy of Immanuel Kant. (see 12th International Kant Congress 2015 » Social Program)

In February 2016, she was awarded the Knight Commander's Cross of the Order of Merit of the Federal Republic of Germany for her outstanding contribution to moral and ethical questions of trust, accountability in civic life, justice and virtue.

Currently, she is the president of the Society for Applied Philosophy, a society founded in 1982 with the aim of promoting philosophical study and research that has a direct bearing on areas of practical concern.

In 2017, she was awarded the Norwegian Holberg Prize for outstanding contributions to research in the arts and humanities "for her influential role in ethical and political philosophy".  The same year she was awarded the Berggruen Prize.

O'Neill is an Honorary Fellow of Somerville College.

In 2021, O'Neill received an honorary doctorate from the University of Antwerp.

Bibliography

Books

 
 (with Neil Manson)

Selected articles
 
 
 
See also:

See also
 List of Northern Ireland members of the House of Lords

References

External links
"On the Side of the Angels" Video of Onora O'Neill debating Ken Livingstone and Peter Lilley at HowTheLightGetsIn Festival, 2 June 2013
What Should Press Regulation Regulate? Podcast of Baroness O'Neill speaking at a conference by the Foundation for Law, Justice & Society, Oxford, 2012
Media Freedoms and Media Standards, Centre for Ethics & Law Annual Lecture, University College London, 28 November 2012 Pdf.
Reith Lectures 2002 on A Question of Trust by O'Neill
Announcement of her introduction at the House of Lords House of Lords minutes of proceedings, 3 March 1999
List of O'Neill's published books and papers in academic journals

 Amy Gutmann on Onora O'Neill University of Pennsylvania president and Berggruen Prize juror Amy Gutmann on Onora O'Neill
 IV—The Most Extensive Liberty Onora O'Neill, Proceedings of the Aristotelian Society, Volume 80, Issue 1, 1 June 1980, Pages 45–60, https://doi.org/10.1093/aristotelian/80.1.45 [Open Access]

1941 births
Living people
20th-century British philosophers
21st-century British philosophers
Commanders of the Order of the British Empire
Fellows of the Academy of Medical Sciences (United Kingdom)
Fellows of Newnham College, Cambridge
Columbia University faculty
Harvard University alumni
British women philosophers
Crossbench life peers
People educated at St Paul's Girls' School
Principals of Newnham College, Cambridge
People from County Antrim
Hastings Center Fellows
Members of the Norwegian Academy of Science and Letters
Alumni of Somerville College, Oxford
Presidents of the British Academy
Political philosophers
Bioethicists
Life peeresses created by Elizabeth II
Presidents of the Aristotelian Society
Fellows of the British Academy
Members of the American Philosophical Society
Fellows of the American Academy of Arts and Sciences
Recipients of the Pour le Mérite (civil class)
Fellows of Somerville College, Oxford
Honorary Fellows of the Royal Society
Female Fellows of the Royal Society
Members of the Royal Irish Academy
Holberg Prize laureates